Woman Trap is a 1936 American drama film directed by Harold Young and written by Brian Marlow and Eugene Walter. The film stars Gertrude Michael, George Murphy, Akim Tamiroff, Sidney Blackmer, Samuel S. Hinds and Dean Jagger. The film was released on March 6, 1936, by Paramount Pictures.

Plot

Cast
Gertrude Michael as Barbara 'Buff' Andrews
George Murphy as Keat Shevlin
Akim Tamiroff as Joe Ramirez de la Valle
Sidney Blackmer as Riley Ferguson
Samuel S. Hinds as Senator Andrews
Dean Jagger as 'Honey' Hogan
Roscoe Karns as Mopsy
Russell Hicks as Dodd 
David Haines as Jimmy Emerson
Julian Rivero as Pancho
Edward Brophy as George Meade 
Bradley Page as Harry Flint
Ralph Malone as Fred Brace
Arthur Aylesworth as City Editor Bert
Hayden Stevenson as Sheriff
John Martin as Boy Radio Operator

References

External links
 

1936 films
American black-and-white films
Paramount Pictures films
American drama films
1936 drama films
Films directed by Harold Young (director)
1930s English-language films
1930s American films